Miss Latina Universe (Spanish: Miss Latina Universo) was a beauty pageant and reality show for Latina women in which one will represent the ethnicity at Miss Universe pageant. The first episode of Miss Latina Universe was scheduled to be broadcast on June 15 on Telemundo and to go on for several weeks, the winner competing in Miss Universe 2014. Rashel Díaz and Raúl González were set to host. The show was postponed indefinitely on June 9, 2014.

References

Miss Universe
Telemundo original programming